Lars Nittve (born 17 September 1953) is a Swedish museum director, curator, art critic and writer. He was the founding Director of Tate Modern in London; former Director of the Moderna Museet in Stockholm; the founding Director of Rooseum – Center for Contemporary Art – in Malmö, Sweden; and Director of the Louisiana Museum of Modern Art in Humlebaek, Denmark.

Nittve was the Executive Director of M+, museum for visual culture of West Kowloon Cultural District in Hong Kong.

Early life and education

Lars Nittve was born in Stockholm in 1953. He studied at the Stockholm School of Economics, and obtained an M.A. at Stockholm University. He also pursued postgraduate studies at New York University. 
In 2009, Nittve earned a PhD, HC, from the Umeå University, Umeå, Sweden.

Career
In 1978 to 1985, Nittve served as lecturer in art history at the Stockholm University. During the same period he has been Senior art critic for the Swedish daily newspaper Svenska Dagbladet, Stockholm, and contributed regularly to Artforum, New York City.

From 1986 Nittve was appointed Chief Curator at the Moderna Museet in Stockholm, where he curated a large number of high-profile exhibitions – both monographic and thematic, among them "Walter De Maria", "Kandinsky and Sweden", "Hilma af Klint" and the seminal "Implosion – a Postmodern Perspective".
From 1990 to 1995, he served as the founding Director of Rooseum – Center for Contemporary Art – in Malmö, Sweden, where he organized the whole exhibition program, including surveys of "Susan Rothenberg", "Allan McCollum", "Sherrie Levine" and "Andreas Gursky". 
In July 1995, Nittve became Director of the Louisiana Museum of Modern Art in Humlebaek, Denmark, where he also curated the groundbreaking exhibition "Sunshine & Noir – Art in L.A. 1960–1997". 
In the spring of 1998, he was named the first Director of Tate Modern, London, which opened in May 2000 to great acclaim.

In 2001, he took up his post as Director of Moderna Museet, the national Museum of Modern Art in Stockholm. He co-curated the thematic exhibition Fashination in 2004 about the dialogue between art and fashion in the last ten years. Other exhibitions include "Time and Place: Los Angeles 1957–1968" (2008); "Anthony McCall" (2009) and most recently "Ed Ruscha: Fifty Years of Painting" (2010). 
During his time at the Moderna Museet, Nittve was instrumental in the fundraising effort (70 million USD) that strengthened the collection and oversaw the expansion of the institution – including The Second Museum of Our Wishes, which focuses on bringing more works by women artists into the collection, the creation of the innovative Renzo Piano designed Pontus Hultén Study Gallery (opened in May 2008), The American Friends of the Moderna Museet Inc. and the opening of Moderna Museet Malmö in 2009.

At the end of 2010, Nittve left his post as Director of the Moderna Museet after having served the maximum length of nine years anyone is permitted to hold the post.

From 2011–2016, Nittve was Executive Director of the M+ museum in the West Kowloon Cultural District in Hong Kong.

Awards and recognition
Lars Nittve has served on the jury of numerous international prizes and has been on the board of a large number of international art organizations. He is a member of the Royal Swedish Academy of Fine Art.

In 2009 he was awarded a PhD H.C by Umeå University, Sweden, where he is also professor in Art history since 2010.

In 2010, Nittve was awarded H. M. The King's Medal in gold, 12th size in the Order of the Serafim's ribbon.

Nittve is the author of several publications on art, as well as articles in journals and catalogues in Sweden and abroad.

In 2013 he was ranked at number 73 in ArtReview Magazine's annual Power 100

References

External links
 Exhibition of the Modern Museum, Stockholm
 Interview with Lars Nittve (swedish)
 Lars Nittve, Lars Nittve on a swedish radiointerview (2002-07-07)

1953 births
Living people
Swedish art curators
Swedish art critics
Directors of museums in Sweden
Stockholm School of Economics alumni
Tate Modern Directors